Marpesia petreus, the ruddy daggerwing, is a species of butterfly of the family Nymphalidae. It is found in Brazil north through Central America, Mexico, and the West Indies to southern Florida. Strays are found as far north as Arizona, Colorado, Nebraska, Kansas, and southern Texas.

The wingspan is 70–95 mm. It is found in many habitats such as tropical woodland and forests, hardwood hammocks, thickets, and subtropical swamps in Florida.

The larvae feed on Ficus carica, Ficus pumila, and Ficus citrifolia. Adults feed on nectar from giant milkweed, Cordia, Casearia, Lantana, and Mikania.

References

Butterflies of North America
Cyrestinae
Butterflies described in 1776
Fauna of Brazil
Nymphalidae of South America
Taxa named by Pieter Cramer